East Budleigh railway station is a closed railway station that served the villages of East Budleigh and Otterton in Devon, England.

History

The London and South Western Railway, which worked the BSR, did not name the station after the nearby village of Otterton to avoid confusion with its  station on the North Cornwall line.

The station originally had a single platform with a passing loop to the south providing access to a goods siding with a cattle dock.

The station was renamed East Budleigh on 27 April 1898.

The station was host to a Southern Railway camping coach from 1936 to 1939. Two camping coaches were also positioned here by the Southern Region from 1954 to 1964.

The station was closed when the line closed on 6 March 1967.

Present state
The station building and platform survive as private accommodation, with a few alterations.

References

Bibliography
 
 
 
 
 
 

Disused railway stations in Devon
Former London and South Western Railway stations
Railway stations in Great Britain opened in 1897
Railway stations in Great Britain closed in 1967
Beeching closures in England